Franklin "Frank" Andoh (born September 21, 1986, in Mankesim) is a Ghanaian footballer, who currently plays for Tudu Mighty Jets.

Career 
Andoh played Ashanti Gold SC. He moved in 2007 to Kessben F.C., After the resolution of Kessben F.C. signed in December 2010 with Tudu Mighty Jets FC.

International 
In 2006 Andoh was called up to Ghana U-20 team

References 

1986 births
Living people
Ghanaian footballers
Association football goalkeepers
Medeama SC players